Caducifer is a genus of sea snails, marine gastropod mollusks in the family Prodotiidae.

Species
Species within the genus Caducifer include:
 Caducifer camelopardalus Watters, 2009
 Caducifer concinnus (Reeve, 1844)
 Caducifer decapitatus (Reeve, 1844)
 Caducifer englerti (Hertlein, 1960)
 Caducifer truncatus (Hinds, 1844)
 Species brought into synonymy
 Caducifer atlanticus Coelho, Matthews & Cardosa, 1970: synonym of Monostiolum atlanticum (Coelho, Matthews & Cardoso, 1970) 
 Caducifer cinis (Reeve, 1846): synonym of Engina cinis (Reeve, 1846)
 Caducifer crebristriatus (Carpenter, 1856): synonym of Monostiolum crebristriatus (Carpenter, 1856)
 Caducifer nebulosus (Gould, 1860): synonym of Zafrona isomella (Duclos, 1840)
 Caducifer nigricostatus (Reeve, 1846): synonym of Monostiolum nigricostatum (Reeve, 1846)
 Caducifer truncata [sic]: synonym of Caducifer truncatus (Hinds, 1844)
 Caducifer weberi Watters, 1983: synonym of Bailya weberi (Watters, 1983) (original combination)

References

External links
 Watters, G. T. (2009). A revision of the western Atlantic Ocean genera Anna, Antillophos, Bailya, Caducifer, Monostiolum, and Parviphos, with description of a new genus, Dianthiphos, and notes on Engina and Hesperisternia Gastropoda: Buccinidae: Pisaniinae) and Cumia (Colubrariidae). The Nautilus. 123(4): 225-275

Prodotiidae
Gastropod genera